Mughal invasion of Konkan (1684) was a part of the Deccan wars. It was a campaign launched by Mughal Emperor Aurangzeb to capture the Konkan region from the Maratha Empire under Sambhaji. The Mughal forces were led by Mu'azzam and Shahbuddin Khan. The harsh climate and the Maratha guerrilla strategy forced the numerically strong Mughal army into a slow retreat. The Maratha army suffered small losses in this unsuccessful campaign of Mughal Empire.In this war Mughals was badly defeated by Marathas.

Background 
Aurangzeb tried attacking the Maratha Empire from all directions, intending to use the Mughal numerical superiority to his advantage. Sambhaji had prepared well for the invasions and the Maratha forces promptly engaged the numerically strong Mughal army in several small battles using guerrilla warfare tactics. However, Sambhaji and his generals attacked and Defeated the Mughal generals whenever they got an opportunity to lure the Mughal generals into decisive battles in the Maratha stronghold territories. Sambhaji had devised a strategy of minimising the losses on his side. If there used to be an opportunity then the Maratha army attacked decisively if the Mughals were too strong in numbers then the Marathas used to retreat. This proved to be a very effective strategy as Aurangzeb's generals were not able capture the Maratha territories for three years continuously. He then decided to attack the Maratha capital Raigad Fort directly from the north and south. He made a pincer attempt to surround the Maratha Capital that led to Mughal invasions of Konkan (1684).

Preparations 
In late 1683, Sambhaji thrashed and put pressure on the Portuguese in Goa and Bombay-Bassein, in a campaign known as Sambhaji's invasion of Goa (1683). Goa was almost captured and the viceroy of Goa asked Aurangzeb for immediate help. At this same time Aurangzeb devised a grand pincer attempt to attack the Maratha capital at Raigad Fort from the North and the South. He sent his general Shahbuddin Khan to attack Raigad through north Konkan from his position in the Guzerati subah. The other Mughal flank was led by Prince Muazzam with a 1,00,000 strong force. His army consisted of 40,000 horsemen, 60,000 foot, 1,900 elephants and 2,000 camels. Prince Muazzam (Shah Alam) was to win the South Konkan, Ramdara and other territories of Maratha's. Muazzam was provided with a huge army of brave and famous sardars like Atishkhan (artillery inspector), Latifshah, Sarfarzkhan, Ikhlaskhan, Nagoji (he knew the territory very well). Originally, Muazzam had a 45,000 force under his command. Hasan Ali Khan who was at bank of river Bhima was ordered to join forces with Muazzam. There were short battles between Maratha forces and leading forces of the Mughal army. The Mughals lost and fled like sheep. Then Mughal force attacked Sampgad (fort of Sampgaon) and seized the fort where their two-three famous sardars were injured.

Both Sambhaji and viceroy had information that Mughal prince Muazzam is coming to the aid of Portuguese with a 1,00,000 strong force. Sambhaji decided to make use of his army against the Portuguese before the Mughal army could reach South Konkan. Sambhaji stormed the colony taking its forts. On 11 December 1683, Sambhaji's army attacked Salsette and Bardez. Sambhaji had 6 thousand cavalry and 8-10 thousand infantry with him. Marathas plundered Bardesh and town of Madgaon. The Portuguese successfully defended only Aguada, Reis-Magos, Raitur and Murgao forts against the onslaught of Marathas. All the other forts were captured by the Marathas. French factor of Surat Francois Martin has described the poor condition of the Portuguese, he said the viceroy was completely dependent on Mughal aid now.

After having captured Salsette and Bardesh (Bardez) the Marathas were exerting to take the island of Goa as well. The viceroy feared if the things remain unchanged, Sambhaji would soon conquer the island of Goa. He went to the body of St. Francis Xavier, lying in the Bom Jesus church in old Goa, and placed his sceptre on the dead saint's hand and prayed for his grace to avert the Maratha threat. When Sambhaji learnt of Muazzam's approach from Ramghat which is just 30 miles from Goa, he withdrew all his forces to Raigad on 2 January 1684. Sambhaji didn't want to get trapped between Portuguese and Mughal armies, hence he decided to adopt a defensive strategy. Orleans said that "Sambhaji didn't consider himself strong enough to resist such huge number and thought of securing safety by a masterly retreat which he affected so cleverly that he retired to his fastness before mogul could engage him".  Sambhaji very quickly and cleverly retreated home before Mughals could attack him. After returning home Sambhaji had an idea of the huge force of Muazzam, hence to face his large army Sambhaji  started to increase strength of his army.

Aurangzeb had also sent Shahbuddin Khan to attack Raigad via North Konkan.

Events in the campaign 
On 28 December 1683 Muazzam burned down the towns of Kudal and Bande. On 15 January 1684 he burned down Dicholi, forces of Muazzam destroyed temples, looted the port of Vengurla. The Mughal forces faced severe food shortage, his soldiers were starving, hence he ordered Khairatkhan and Yakutkhan of Surat to send him food supplies. Muazzam asked for permission to pass his ships carrying food which was granted by Portuguese. The Portuguese sent a lawyer to Muzzam requesting Alam not to retreat from Konkan and keep fighting against Sambhaji, Portuguese who had lost more than 20 lakh rupees due to war with Maratha. Still he was demanding this same amount and 600 horses and the Konkan territory from Banda to Mirjan. However, no such deal took place in reality because the ships carrying food supplies sent to Muazzam did not reach Goa because, different Maratha sea-fort commanders attacked and captured them when they received information about these ships. Only a few ships escaped but they did not carry enough food supplies. Muazzam was ordered to return from Konkan. Muazzam decided to leave Konkan before rainy season. On their way back, the Mughal army suffered much (while going through Ramghat) due to scarcity of food, constant attacks of Marathas, and diseases. When Muazzam crossed the Ramghat, he was left with little cavalry, the Marathas were constantly attacking him from all sides using guerilla tactics. Mughal sardar Bahadur Khan met Muazzam and provided him with equipment and force. In April–May of 1684 Muazzam stayed at shakes/sheks village near Bijapur, in the month of June he reached at Bank of river Bhima where he had battle with 5000 Maratha forces and he was injured in that battle. The expedition of Konkan by Muazzam was big failure as the Mughals lost 60,000 soldiers, hundreds of camels, artillery pieces, lakhs of rupees, for virtually no success.

After the 1684 monsoon, Aurangzeb's other general Shahbuddin Khan directly attacked the Maratha capital, Raigad. Maratha commanders successfully defended Raigad. Aurangzeb sent Khan Jehan to help, but Hambirrao Mohite, commander-in-chief of the Maratha army, defeated him in a fierce battle at Patadi. The second division of the Maratha army attacked Shahbuddin Khan at Pachad, inflicting heavy losses on the Mughal army.

Aftermath and consequences 
The campaign had various political and military consequences.

Military consequences

1) Aurangzeb had sent his son Bahadur Shah I, and other great nobles on this invasion. This invasion lasted from 20 August 1683 to 24 May 1684. There were few incidents of actual fighting. At the end of the battle, the situation remained the same. Only the main road between Nizampur and Ramghat to Vengurla was destroyed. By this time the crops had been removed. There was no question of looting as there was no other place in Pethe except Sampagava. The dew did not cause much damage to the village even before the invasion.

The effects of this invasion on politics were:

1. The Portuguese who were inclined towards the Mughals due to Sambhaji's invasion were annoyed by the plunder of Bardesh by the people of Shah Alam and the destruction of the Mughal Armory caravan and the looting . He insisted on concluding a pact with Sambhaji. The Mughals lost a friend as it was their interest to depend on Sambhaji.

2. Seeing the misery of the Portuguese and considering the struggle of the Mughal emperor, it was in their interest to hold on to Sambhaji. Also, the arson and looting of Sambhaji in the region near Mumbai was stopped.

3. Taking advantage of the animosity between the Portuguese and the Arabs, Sambhaji befriended the Arabs, and with the support of Arabs Chhatrapati Sambhaji Maharaj's navy became stronger.

4. The Adilshahi king was persuaded to side Sambhaji  was able to make a pact with them. Hence an alliance of Adilashahi-Marathas-Qutbshahi was formed.

The mughal ships suffered heavy losses only for the transportation of grain. Much of the grain supply fell into the hands of Sambhaji and some sank in the sea. So Shah Alam had to return and there was a famine in Surat.

In summary, the Mughals were defeated even though they marched with a force of one lakh and ran hundreds of miles without encountering a real enemy.

References 

Conflicts in 1684
Mughal Empire
Konkan
Battles fought by Marathas under Sambhaji
Battles involving the Mughal Empire
 History of Mumbai
 History of Vasai
 History of Daman and Diu
 History of Goa